Roland Muhlen (August 23, 1942 – February 1, 2023) was an American sprint canoer who competed in the early to mid-1970s. Competing in two Summer Olympics, he earned his best finish of sixth in the C-2 1000 m event at Munich in 1972.

Muhlen died in Cincinnati, Ohio, on February 1, 2023, at the age of 80.

References

Sports-reference.com profile

External links

1942 births
2023 deaths
American male canoeists
Canoeists at the 1972 Summer Olympics
Canoeists at the 1976 Summer Olympics
Olympic canoeists of the United States